The Self Creek Bridge is a historic bridge near Daisy, Arkansas. The open spandrel deck arch bridge carries U.S. Route 70 over Self Creek near its mouth at Lake Greeson. It was built in 1949 at a cost of $287,000. The bridge was built because the construction of the dam which impounds the lake required re-routing of the highway.

The bridge was listed on the National Register of Historic Places in 2000.

See also
List of bridges on the National Register of Historic Places in Arkansas
National Register of Historic Places listings in Pike County, Arkansas

References 

Road bridges on the National Register of Historic Places in Arkansas
Bridges completed in 1949
National Register of Historic Places in Pike County, Arkansas
Open-spandrel deck arch bridges in the United States
Concrete bridges in the United States
1949 establishments in Arkansas
Transportation in Pike County, Arkansas